Idursulfase (brand name Elaprase), manufactured by Takeda, is a drug used to treat Hunter syndrome (also called MPS-II). It is a purified form of the lysosomal enzyme iduronate-2-sulfatase and is produced by recombinant DNA technology in a human cell line.

It is one of the most expensive drugs ever produced, costing US$567,412 per patient per year.

References

External links
 

Orphan drugs